OSNR, a four-letter acronym or abbreviation, may refer to:

Optical signal-to-noise ratio
Optical spectrum analyzer
Optical performance monitoring
Other / Signature Not Required - a delivery classification used by some shippers.